Amoria lineola is a species of sea snail, a marine gastropod mollusc in the family Volutidae, the volutes.

Description
The length of the shell varies between 35 mm and 50 mm.

Distribution
This marine species occurs off Queensland, Australia.

References
Notes

Sources
 Bail P. & Limpus A. (2009). An unrecognized species of the genus Amoria Gray, 1855 (Gastropoda: Volutidae) from East Australia. Novapex 10(3): 97-101

External links
 

Volutidae
Gastropods described in 2009